The 2017 Bank of Liuzhou Cup was a professional tennis tournament played on outdoor hard courts. It was the second edition of the tournament and was part of the 2017 ITF Women's Circuit. It took place in Liuzhou, China, on 23–29 October 2017.

Singles main draw entrants

Seeds 

 1 Rankings as of 16 October 2017.

Other entrants 
The following players received a wildcard into the singles main draw:
  Cao Siqi
  You Xiaodi
  Yuan Chengyiyi
  Zhang Yuxuan

The following player received entry using a junior exempt:
  Olesya Pervushina

The following players received entry from the qualifying draw:
  Ingrid Neel
  Urszula Radwańska
  Sun Xuliu
  Yang Yidi

Champions

Singles

 Wang Yafan def.  Nao Hibino, 3–6, 6–4, 3–3, ret.

Doubles
 
 Han Xinyun /  Makoto Ninomiya def.  Jacqueline Cako /  Laura Robson, 6–2, 7–6(7–3)

External links 
 2017 Bank of Liuzhou Cup at ITFtennis.com

2017 ITF Women's Circuit
2017 in Chinese tennis
Liuzhou Open